Good Behavior is an American drama television series based on the novella series by Blake Crouch. The series stars Michelle Dockery as Letty Raines, a con artist who becomes involved with a hitman named Javier Pereira, played by Juan Diego Botto. Good Behavior debuted on TNT on November 15, 2016.

On January 14, 2017, the series was renewed for a second season, which premiered on October 15, 2017.  On November 6, 2018, TNT canceled the series after two seasons.

Series overview

Episodes

Season 1 (2016–17)

Season 2 (2017)

Ratings

Season 1 (2016–17)

Season 2 (2017)

References

External links
 

Good Behavior
Good Behavior